Belludi  is a village in the southern state of Karnataka, India. It is located in the Harihar taluk of Davanagere district in Karnataka.

Demographics
As of 2001 India census, Belludi had a population of 6847 with 3600 males and 3247 females.

See also
 Davanagere
 Districts of Karnataka

References

External links
 http://Davanagere.nic.in/

Villages in Davanagere district